En Kadhal Kanmani is a 1990 Indian Tamil-language romance film directed by T. J. Joy, starring Vikram and Rekha Nambiar. This is the debut film for Vikram. It was released on 17 October 1990 and failed at the box office.

Plot 

Vinod, a smoking addict falls in love with Hema. The rest of the story is how Vinod is able to stop smoking and marry Hema.

Cast 
 Vikram as Vinod
 Rekha Nambiar as Hema
V. K. Ramasamy
S. S. Chandran
Kovai Sarala
Loose Mohan
Gandhimathi
Vennira Aadai Moorthy
Ennathe Kannaiah
Oru Viral Krishna Rao
Kallapetti Singaram
Sumathi
Typist Gopu

Production 
The film was produced by several employees of Indian Bank, who chose to turn producers for a small-budget experimental film named En Kadhal Kanmani. The film's premise was about a smoker who has to stop the habit if he wants to marry his girlfriend. Vikram was cast in the film after the makers had seen his advertisements and television serial Galatta Kudumbam. This is the debut film for Vikram.

Soundtrack 
The soundtrack was composed by L. Vaidyanathan, with lyrics by Vairamuthu.

Release 
En Kadhal Kanmani was released on 17 October 1990, and failed at the box office.

References

External links 
 

1990 films
1990 romance films
1990s Tamil-language films
Films about smoking
Films scored by L. Vaidyanathan
Indian romance films